DX1 may refer to:

 Yamaha DX1, an FM synthesizer
 (7202) 1995 DX1, a main-belt minor planet
 Deus Ex (video game), a 2000 action role-playing video game

See also
 DX (disambiguation)